The following is the discography of Nottz, an American hip hop record producer and rapper.

Singles are in bold.

1998

3rd Eye - Studio Life (Unreleased)
A1. "Final Exam"
B1. "'88 Flashback"

D.V. Alias Khrist - BlackMask  (Movie)
00. "The Attack Is On"

D.V. Alias Khrist and Lord Have Mercy - Lyricist Lounge, Volume One
2-08. "Holy Water"

Busta Rhymes - E.L.E. (Extinction Level Event): The Final World Front
02. "Everybody Rise"
03. "Where We Are About To Take It"
04. "Extinction Level Event (The Song of Salvation)"

1999

Various - Violator: The Album
03. "Whatcha Come Around Here For?" - Flipmode Squad

The Notorious B.I.G. - Born Again
05. "Dangerous MCs"

Fat Joe - Thicker Than Water soundtrack
05. "Thicker Than Blood"

Lord Have Mercy - Thee Ungodly Hour (Unreleased)
00. "Paint Ya Face"
00. "These Men Don't Cry" 
00. "Home Sweet Home"

2000

Busta Rhymes - Anarchy
11. "Get Out!!"
13. "A Trip Out Of Town"
21. "Anarchy"

Rah Digga - Dirty Harriet
08. "Showdown"
09. "The Last Word" feat Outsidaz
11. "Straight Spittin' Part II"
12. "What's Up Wit' That"
14. "Just For You"

Funkmaster Flex - 60 Minutes Of Funk - The Mix Tape Volume IV
19. "Uhhnnh" - The Bad Seed

M.O.P. - Warriorz
14. "Home Sweet Home"

Xzibit - Restless
04. "U Know"  (co-producer)

2001

Krumbsnatcha - Long Awaited - Snatcha Season Pt. 2

04. "Blaze" 
09. "Do U Wanna" 
11. "Can't Get None" 
13. "Hood Turn Hot"
14. "Killer In Me"
15. "Jungle"
16. "Take Your Pain Away"

Krumbsnatcha - Training Day Soundtrack

02. "W.O.L.V.E.S."

Busta Rhymes - Genesis

01. "Intro"
09. "Pass The Courvoisier"
20. "Bad Dreams"

Ed O.G. - The Truth Hurts

05. "What U Know"

2002

Snoop Dogg - Snoop Dogg Presents…Doggy Style Allstars Vol. 1
13. "Don't Make A Wrong Move"

Scarface - The Fix
06. "Keep Me Down"

Krumbsnatcha - Respect All Fear None
09. "Oxygen"

50 Cent - "Guess Who's Back?"
09. "Be a Gentleman"

2003

G-Unit - Beg for Mercy
09. "Footprints"

Kardinal Offishall - Firestarter Vol. 2: The F-Word Theory (Unreleased)
00. "Sick!"

Black Moon - Total Eclipse
06. "Why We Act This Way?"

Craig G - This Is Now!!!
05. "Now That's What's Up"

Pitch Black - Pitch Black Law
08. "R You Ready 4 This?"

Method Man - Def Jam Vendetta Soundtrack
12. "Uh Huh"

2004

Krumbsnatcha - Let The Truth Be Told
03. "Do Me"
04. "Boston To VA" 
06. "Thorough" 
14. "Get Live" 
00. "Never Grow Up"

Cassidy - Split Personality
12. "Real Talk"

213 - The Hard Way
07. "Lonely Girl"

Ghostface - The Pretty Toney Album
14. "Be This Way"
16. "Tooken Back"

Kardinal Offishall - Kill Bloodclott Bill
04. "Gas"

2005

Ghostface Killah and Trife Da God - Put It On The Line
03. "Struggle" - Ghostface Killah

Consequence - Caught Up in the Hype (Single 12')
01. "Caught Up in the Hype"

Skillz - Confessions of a Ghostwriter
06. "Wave Ya Hands" 
07. "Imagine"
08. "S.K.I.L.L.Z."

Canibus - Hip-Hop for Sale
01. "It's No Other Than"
02. "Back Wit Heat"
04. "Show 'Em How"
05. "Dear Academy"
06. "I Gotcha"

Royce da 5'9" - Independent's Day
05. "Politics" 
09. "Blow Dat..."

2006

Little Brother - Soldiers of Fortune (Hall of Justus album)
07. "Life of The Party"

Bilal - "Love for Sale" (unreleased)
01. "Something To Hold On To"

Snoop Dogg - Tha Blue Carpet Treatment
05. "That's That Shit"

The Game - Doctor's Advocate
10. "One Night"

2007

Sunshine Anderson - Sunshine At Midnight
03. "My Whole Life"

Boot Camp Clik - Casualties of War
04. "Bubblin' Up"

WC - Guilty by Affiliation
03. "Jack & The Bean Stalk"

Swizz Beatz - One Man Band Man
03. "Big Munny"

Kanye West - Graduation
07. "Barry Bonds"  (co-produced by Kanye West)

Little Brother - Getback
08. "Two-Step Blues"

Scarface - Made
04. "Girl You Know"

Cassidy - B.A.R.S. The Barry Adrian Reese Story
11. "I Get My Paper"

DJ Drama - Gangsta Grillz: The Album
13. "Talk Bout Me"

2008

Snoop Dogg - Ego Trippin'

11. "Deez Hollywood Nights"

Dwele - Sketches of a Man

05. "A Few Reasons (Truth Pt. 2)"

Blackndeckah
 "You"

AZ - Undeniable

04. "Fire"
10. "Now I Know"

The Game - L.A.X.

07. "Cali Sunshine"  
08. "Ya Heard"

Kardinal Offishall - Not 4 Sale

08. "Ill Eagle Alien"

Murs - Murs for President

10. "Me and This Jawn"
11. "Think You Know Me"
00. "Better Than The Best" (Leftover)

J Dilla - Pay Jay (Unreleased MCA Album)

01. "Diamonds"

Termanology - Politics As Usual

05. "Please Don't Go"
06. "Float"
08. "Drugs Crimes Gorillaz"

Bishop Lamont - The Confessional (unrelease)

"Ghetto Song" 
"What People Do"
"Why U Wanna Piss Me Off"

Scarface - Emeritus

04. "Can't Get Right" 
05. "Still Here"

Adama

"Take Me Home"/ Remix

Rapper Big Pooh - Rapper's Delight

"Rapper's Delight"

Diamond D - The Huge Hefner Chronicles

03. "D-I-A-M-O-N-D"

Ne-Yo

"Free Me"

Drake 

"One More Time"

2009

Asher Roth - Asleep in the Bread Aisle
15. "Y.O.U." (UK Bonus Track)

Slaughterhouse - Slaughterhouse
00. "Woodstock (Hood Hop)"

Finale - A Pipe Dream and A Promise
06. "Jumper Cables"
11. "Brother's Keeper"

T.I.
"The Way You Want It"

Skyzoo - The Salvation
05. "Popularity"
16. "Maintain"

M.O.P. - Foundation
11. "I'm A Brownsvillain"

KRS-One & Buckshot - Survival Skills
09. "One Shot"

Cormega  -"Born & Raised"
10. "What Did I Do"

Shafiq Husayn - Shafiq En' A-Free-Ka (Nottz Remix)
03. "Cheeba"

Royce da 5'9" - Street Hop
02. "Count for Nothing"
13. "Street Hop"

Rakim - The Seventh Seal
04. "Man Above"

Snoop Dogg - Malice n Wonderland
11. "Pimpin' Ain't EZ"

2010

Rah Digga - DJ Booth.net exclusive

"A Few Thoughts"

Snoop Dogg - More Malice

02. "Protocol"

Dwele - W.ants W.orld W.omen

02. "I Wish"
16. "Give Me A Chance"

Mayer Hawthorne - bonus "Stones Throw Records recording artist's

"I Need You"

Bilal - Airtight's Revenge

04. "Flying"
12. "Lost My Mind" (Bonus)
00. "Free"

Rah Digga - Classic
Entire Album produced by Nottz.
01. "The Book Of Rashia"
02. "Who Gonna Check Me Boo"
03. "This Ain't No Lil' Kid Rap"
04. "Straight Spittin' IV"
05. "Classic"
06. "Solidified" 
07. "Feel Good" 
08. "Viral"
09. "Back It Up"
10. "You Got It"
00. "This ain't No Lil Kid Rap" (Remix)

2011

Nefew - Man Vs. Many
02. "Game"

Joell Ortiz - Free Agent
08. "Nursery Rhyme"

Pusha T - Fear of God
08. "Open Your Eyes"

Pusha T - Fear of God II: Let Us Pray
12. "Alone in Vegas"

W.O.L.L.
 "Big Bang Theory"

Torae - For The Record
13. "Thank You"

Strong Arm Steady - Arms & Hammers
06. "All the Brothers"

Reks - Rhythmatic Eternal King Supreme
03. "Limelight"

Rapsody - Thank H.E.R. Now
18. "H.E.R. Throne"

Rapper Big Pooh - Dirty Pretty Things
04. "Are You Ready" 
08. "Ballad Of The Son"

Asher Roth 
"Summertime"

Royce da 5'9" - Success Is Certain
03. "Merry Go Round"
06. "On The Boulevard

Snoop Dogg & Wiz Khalifa - Mac & Devin Go to High School soundtrack
04. "6:30"

2012

AWAR - The Laws of Nature
04. "Keep Risin"
05. "Until the End"

Bow Wow
 "Yeah Yeah"

Nefew & Shakes - For Hip-Hop
01. "Change The World" 
02. "Last Days"
03. "For Hip-Hop"
04. "Been There Done That"
05. "We March"

Wale - Folarin
09. "Skool Daze"

Kardinal Offishall
"Wessup"

2013

MellowHigh & EarlWolf
"Look"

Pusha T - My Name Is My Name
10. "Nosetalgia"  (co-produced by Kanye West)

Xzibit, B-Real & Demrick - Serial Killers Vol. 1
12. "Laugh Now"

Kardinal Offishall 
"Game of Clones"

2014

Mac Miller
"Walkin Home"

Slaughterhouse - House Rules
02. "Say Dat Then"

Asher Roth
"Rasputin"

The Proz
"Doap"

The Game - Blood Moon: Year of the Wolf
17. "Bloody Moon"

The Lox - The Trinity (3rd Sermon)
06. "Now Listen"

2015

Asher Roth
"Blow Yr Head"

YU of Diamond District - Persona
02. "Homicide"

Diamond District - March On Washington Redux
10. "Lost Cause"

Mac Miller
"Pet Sounds"

Scarface - Deeply Rooted
07. "Anything" (produced with N.O. Joe)

Add-2 - Prey For the Poor
01. "Prey For the Poor"

Talib Kweli & 9th Wonder - Indie 500
01. "Which Side Are You On" 
09. "These Waters" 
11. "Bangers"

Bankrupt Billionaires
"I'm Here (Remix)"

Busta Rhymes - The Return of the Dragon (The Abstract Went on Vacation)
15. "Proper Leader's Skit"

2016

Torae - Entitled
04. "Clap Shit Up"

Koache - Game Point
02. "Hood Love" 
03. "Turn Me Back" 
04. "Back In the Day" 
06. "Karma"

BJ the Chicago Kid
"OMG"

Royce da 5'9" - Tabernacle: Trust the Shooter
05. "Which Is Cool"

Token
 "Necessary Evil"

Royce da 5'9 - Layers
07. "Shine"

Alpha Faktion - Creative Control
"Creative Control"

Snoop Dogg - Coolaid
03. "Don't Stop"

The Bad Seed - Coreyography
08. "Belt Off"

Marvalyss
"Black Caesars"

Reks - The Greatest X
10. "The Recipe"
11. "Unknown"

Villain Notsha
"Untrue"

Carl Roe - Eleven Chuck
02. "S. State. St."

Talib Kweli - Awful People are Great at Parties
09. "Every Ghetto Pt. 2"

Rapsody - Crown
03. "Tina Turner"

Ras Kass
"Amerikkkan Horror Story, Pt. 1"

Termanology - More Politics
08. "Krazy Thangs"

Jaheim - "Struggle Love"
07. ""Something Tells Me"

Hodgy - Fireplace: TheNotTheOtherSide
05. "They Want"
12. "The Now"

T.I. - Us or Else: Letter to the System
01. "I Believe"
09. "Pain"

2017

Stik Figa - Central Standard Time
02. "Down Payment"

Coin Banks
"H.E.R."

Talib Kweli & Styles P - The Seven
01. "Poets and Gangstas"

Royce da 5'9" - Bar Exam 4
10. "Chopping Block"

Rapsody
"The Pain"

Sean Price - Imperius Rex
14. "Clans & Cliks"

Snoop Dogg
 "What Is This?"

GQ - E 14th
02. "Everything the Same"
04. "Laundry Day"

Rapsody - Laila's Wisdom
01. "Laila's Wisdom"

Hustle Gang - We Want Smoke
07. "So High"

Evidence Weather or Not
04. "Jim Dean"

Kardinal Offishall - Dave Chappelle - Equanimity (Netflix Comedy Special)
00. "Reaching Through The Darkness" (show outro)

2018

Apathy - The Widow's Son
06. "Alien Weaponry"

Evidence - Weather Or Not
04. "Jim Dean" 
08. "Bad Publicity" featuring:Krondon

Phonte - No News Is Good News
04. "Expensive Genes"

9th Wonder Presents: Jamla Is the Squad II
09. Reuben Vincent - "You Know I Gotta"

Serial Killers - Day of the Dead
02. "Get Away with It"

Seed x Nottz - No Way In Hell
"Whole album"

Napsndreds - Trouble & A Pair of Dice
"Whole album"

2019

Seth Hirsch
00. "Say Goodbye" feat. Mac Miller

Smif-N-Wessun - The All
07. "Let Me Tell Ya" Feat. Rick Ross

Murs - The Iliad Is Dead and the Odyssey Is Over
03. "My Hero" feat. Heather Victoria
11. "Super Cojo Bros" feat. GQ & Cojo

Little Brother - May the Lord Watch
04. "Right On Time"
11. "Sittin Alone"

Andy Mineo - Work in Process
08. "1988 Remake 2"

Rapsody - Eve
12."Michelle" feat. Elle Varner	
14."Hatshepsut" feat. Queen Latifah

Prayah
00."I Swear" feat. Keyzz

2020

The Lox - Living Off Xperience
06. "Story"

Busta Rhymes - Extinction Level Event 2: The Wrath of God
01. "E.L.E. 2 Intro" (with Chris Rock, Rakim, and Pete Rock)
06. "E.L.E. 2 The Wrath of God" (featuring Minister Louis Farrakhan)
07. "Slow Flow" (with Ol' Dirty Bastard)
19. "Look Over Your Shoulder" (featuring Kendrick Lamar)
21. "Freedom?" (featuring Nikki Grier)
28. "Follow The Wave" (feat. Flipmode Squad, Rampage, Rah Digga, Spliff Star)

2021

Snoop Dogg - From Tha Streets 2 Tha Suites
09. "Look Around" (featuring J-Black)

Nottz - The Future Is Female 
00. "Black Woman" (featuring Rapsody, Ke Turner, Rah Digga and Nikki Grier)

Snoop Dogg - Algorithm
14. "Murder Music" (featuring:Benny The Butcher, Jadakiss & Busta Rhymes)
16. "Qualified" (featuring:Larry June and October London - (Prod by Nottz and keyboard by: Brian "B Nasty" Reid)
20. "Whatever You On" (Jane Handcock - (Prod by Nottz and keyboard by: Brian "B Nasty" Reid)

2022

Snoop Dogg - BODR - Bacc On Death Row
15. "It's In The Air"(featuring Uncle Murda and Jane Handcock)

Phife Dawg - Forever
05. "Sorry" (featuring V.Rich)
13. "Forever" (co-produced by DJ Rasta Root and V.Rich)

Diamond D - Rear View mirror
05. "The Rear View" 
08. "Ouuu" (Feat. Stacy Epps)

Shateish - EP
01. "Devil's Chords"
07. "We"

2023

Jane Handcock - World Of Woman
13. "I Wanna Thank Me" 2.0 (feat. Snoop Dogg)

See also 
 Love for Sale (Bilal album), an unreleased album by Bilal, for which Nottz assisted in producing

References

Production discographies
Discographies of American artists
Hip hop discographies